Weather is the ninth studio album by American singer Meshell Ndegeocello, released on November 15, 2011, on the Naïve label.

Critical reception
Weather was met with "universal acclaim" reviews from critics. At Metacritic, which assigns a weighted average rating out of 100 to reviews from mainstream publications, this release received an average score of 82 based on 15 reviews.

In a review for AllMusic, critic reviewer Andy Kellman wrote: "The wealth of lithe, quiet backdrops played at slow tempos allows Ndegeocello, who switches between husky lower and sweet upper registers with more ease than ever, to tickle the ears. No song rocks, but a few groove." Alex McPherson of The Guardian described Weather as "deeply intimate, wholly engrossing,' going on to say "Ndegéocello's work has often been heavy with mood while elliptical of songcraft, but Weather contains her most direct material since the early 1990s." At Spin, Barry Walters explained: "After kick-starting neo-soul in the '90s, this chimerical bassist shimmied through countless genres as if to dodge and defy any tag — racial, gender, sexual, aesthetic. Here, she teams with producer Joe Henry for a somber mood piece that plays the introspection of singer-songwriter folk as meditative jazz."

Accolades

Track listing

Personnel

Musicians
 Meshell Ndegeocello – bass, vocals
 Deantoni Parks – drums
 Nicci Kasper – vocals
 Chris Bruce – guitar, bass
 Keefus Ciancia – piano
 Gabe Noel – cello, bass
 Benji Hughes – piano, vocals
 Deantoni Parks – drums
 Jay Bellerose – drums

Production
 Joe Henry – producer
 Ryan Freeland − engineer, mastering, mixer

Charts

References

External links
 
 

2011 albums
Meshell Ndegeocello albums
Albums produced by Joe Henry
Alternative rock albums by American artists